Tomb-e Sat (also Romanized as Tomb-e Sāṭ; also known as Tomb Basāt, Tonb Basāt, and Towm-e Basāt) is a village in Howmeh Rural District, in the Central District of Minab County, Hormozgan Province, Iran. At the 2006 census, its population was 180, in 32 families.

References 

Populated places in Minab County